Gianni Togni (born 24 July 1956 in Rome) is an Italian singer.

He begins his musical experience with the album In una simile circostanza (1975), he obtained a notable success in 1980 with the single "Luna", from the album ... E in quel momento, which ranked first in the Italian hit parade. Other top-ten singles included the songs "Semplice" and "Vivi".

Discography 
 In una simile circostanza (1975)
 ...E in quel momento, entrando in un teatro vuoto, un pomeriggio vestito di bianco, mi tolgo la giacca, accendo le luci e sul palco m'invento... (1980)
 Le mie strade (1981)
 Bollettino dei naviganti (1982)
 Gianni Togni (1983)
 Stile libero (1984)
 Segui il tuo cuore (1985)
 Di questi tempi (1987)
 Bersaglio mobile (1988)
 Singoli (1992)
 Cari amori miei (1996)
 Ho bisogno di parlare (1997)
 La vita nuova (2006)

Musicals
 Hollywood - Ritratto di un divo (1998)

Influence 
DJ Lhasa covered the song "Giulia", later remixed by Gabry Ponte.

References

External links 

 

1956 births
Italian male singers
Living people
Singers from Rome